Khleb (meaning 'bread') is an album released by the Russian band Leningrad. This album was later re-released in Germany, where it gained some popularity.

"Malaya Leningradskaya Simfoniya" is a classical compilation of five Leningrad songs performed by the Rastrelli Cello Quartet, arranged by Sergey Drabkina.  The songs are: "WWW", "Komon Evribadi", "Mne bi v nebo", "Cell Phone" and "Tango (Ya tak lyublyu tebya)".

Track listing
"Ленин-Град" - Lenin-Grad – 2:43   	 
"Небесный теннис" - Nebesniy tennis - (Heavenly tennis) – 3:28  	
"На Не" - Na Ne – 2:19  	
"Суть" - Sut (Essence) – 2:27  	 
"Ф.К." - F.K. – 2:09  	 
"Нефть" - Neft - (Crude-oil) – 1:42  	 
"Кто того" - Kto togo - (Who to Whom) – 2:42  	 
"Kaka-in" – (Cocaine) - 2:08  	 
"Свобода" - Svoboda - (Freedom) – 3:09  	 
"Флаг" - Flag – 1:48  	 
"Кредит" - Kredit - (Credit) – 3:18  	 
"На хуй рок-н-ролл" - Na Huy Rok-n-Roll - (Fuck Rock n' Roll) – 2:40  	 
"Мчащийся сквозь грозу" - Mchaschiysya skvoz grozu - (Rushing Through a Storm) – 2:35  
"Багдад" – Bagdad - Baghdad - 2:54  	 
"Гитара" - Gitara - (Guitar) – 1:40  	 
"Песня старого фаната" - Pesnya starogo fanata - (Song of an old fan) – 1:36  	 
"Малая ленинградская симфония" - Malaya leningradskaya simfoniya - (Small Leningrad Symphony) – 6:26

2005 albums
Leningrad (band) albums